The 2023 Merrimack Warriors men's volleyball team, the first ever Merrimack men's volleyball team, represents Merrimack College in the 2023 NCAA Division I & II men's volleyball season. The Warriors, led by first year head coach Ray Lewis, play their home games at Hammel Court. The Warriors play in the newly created Northeast Conference men's volleyball conference. They were picked to finish seventh in the conference preseason poll.

Season highlights
Will be filled in as the season progresses.

Roster

Schedule
TV/Internet Streaming information:
All home games will be streamed on NEC Front Row. Most road games will be streamed by the schools streaming service.

 *-Indicates conference match.
 Times listed are Eastern Time Zone.

Announcers for televised games
Penn State: Dylan Price & Thomas English
Harvard: No commentary
Mount Olive: Michael Deleo
Barton
Queens: 
Central State: 
American International: 
Fisher: 
Harvard: 
Daemen: 
D'Youville: 
Fairleigh Dickinson: 
St. Francis
NJIT: 
Sacred Heart: 
American International: 
Sacred Heart: 
LIU: 
St. Francis Brooklyn: 
Fairleigh Dickinson: 
St. Francis: 
D'Youville : 
Daemen : 
LIU: 
St. Francis Brooklyn:

References

2023 in sports in Massachusetts
Merrimack
Merrimack